Chronic 2006 is a mixtape by rapper Young Buck, Hosted by Jamie Foxx and DJ Whoo Kid. The mixtape features exclusive tracks and freestyles from Young Buck with appearances by Mobb Deep, Lil Scrappy, M.O.P., and more. It was released for digital download on August 4, 2006.

Background
The Mixtape was 1 of 3 released by Young Buck to promote his upcoming album Buck The World (the other two being Welcome To The Traphouse & Case Dismissed – The Introduction of G-Unit South)

Track list

References

2006 mixtape albums
Young Buck albums